Drake Garrett (born March 19, 1946) is a former American football defensive back. He played for the Denver Broncos in 1968 and 1970.

References

1946 births
Living people
American football defensive backs
Michigan State Spartans football players
Denver Broncos players